Late Night Tales: David Holmes is a DJ mix album curated and performed by David Holmes for Late Night Tales series, released by Night Time Stories on 21 October 2016. It features artists such as Children of Sunshine, Buddy Holly, Neo Maya, Geese, and Jon Hopkins, among many others.

The album was highly praised by critics, getting a rating of 99/100 (universal acclaim) by Metacritic. The Irish Times''' Jim Carrol wrote, "Holmes does not disappoint, creating powerfully evocative, engaging and moving sound essays on life, loss, mortality, brotherhood and memory. [...] Holmes’ selections for the small hours are full of heft, melancholy and deeply felt connections." Brian Coney of The Quietus wrote, “Few individuals fit the mould for a much-loved, artist-curated compilation series quite as comfortably as David Holmes. [...] In taking our hand but never gripping too tight, Holmes taps into something that even the best Late Night Tales compilations sometimes neglect: the pure self-therapy of total escapism." Ransom Note author Joe Roberts wrote, "If there is such thing as a soul, then Holmes has poured his own into this."

Track listing

References

External links
 Late Night Tales: David Holmes'' at Late Night Tales

David Holmes
2015 compilation albums
David Holmes (musician) albums